Sugar Creek Township is one of fourteen townships in Shelby County, Indiana. As of the 2010 census, its population was 1,086 and it contained 412 housing units.

Sugar Creek Township was organized in 1840.

Geography

Unincorporated towns
 Boggstown

References

External links
 Indiana Township Association
 United Township Association of Indiana

Townships in Shelby County, Indiana
Townships in Indiana